The 1974 Polish Speedway season was the 1974 season of motorcycle speedway in Poland.

Individual

Polish Individual Speedway Championship
The 1974 Individual Speedway Polish Championship final was held on 29 September at Gorzów.

Golden Helmet
The 1974 Golden Golden Helmet organised by the Polish Motor Union (PZM) was the 1974 event for the league's leading riders.

Calendar

Final classification
Note: Result from final score was subtracted with two the weakest events.

Pairs

Polish Pairs Speedway Championship
The 1974 Polish Pairs Speedway Championship was the 1974 edition of the Polish Pairs Speedway Championship. The final was held at Bydgoszcz on 20 October.

Junior Championship
 winner - Jerzy Rembas

Silver Helmet
 winner - Gerard Stach

Team

Team Speedway Polish Championship
The 1974 Team Speedway Polish Championship was the 1974 edition of the Team Polish Championship. 

Włókniarz Częstochowa won the gold medal. The team included Marek Cieślak, Józef Jarmuła and Andrzej Jurczyński.

First League

Second League

References

Poland Individual
Poland Team
Speedway
1974 in Polish speedway